Giorgos Adamopoulos (1946 – 24 February 2023) was a Greek politician. A member of PASOK, he served in the Hellenic Parliament from 1989 to 2000.

Adamopoulos died in Larissa on 24 February 2023.

References

1946 births
2023 deaths
Greek MPs 1989 (June–November)
Greek MPs 1989–1990
Greek MPs 1990–1993
Greek MPs 1993–1996
Greek MPs 1996–2000
PASOK politicians
National and Kapodistrian University of Athens alumni
Politicians from Larissa